Embrithini is a weevil tribe in the subfamily Entiminae.

Genera 
Adiatmetus – Adorhabdotus – Amphitmetus – Anentypotrachelus – Aperitmetus – Babaultia – Cadoderus – Chelyophyes – Cissodicasticus – Dicasticus – Embrithes – Embrithodes – Entypotrachelus – Epibrithus – Epicasticus – Epipedosoma – Eupiona – Gakmetus – Holoprosopus – Hypertmetus – Ischnobrotus – Leuroscapus – Machaerorrhinas – Mecomerinthus – Merulla – Merullodes – Mesphrigodes – Metaplesias – Mimaptomerus – Neosphrigodes – Oncophyes – Opseodes – Opseotrophus – Paratmetus – Peribrotus – Peritelomus – Peritmetus – Perrinella – Plocometopus – Polyrhabdotus – Procasticus – Pseudisaniris – Pternogymnus – Rhadinoscapus – Rhyncholobus – Simodes – Sphrigodellus – Sphrigodes – Stenorrhamphus – Trepimetas

References 

 Marshall, G.A.K. 1942: On some East African Otiorrhynchinae (Col., Curcul.) Annals and Magazine of Natural History (11), 9(49): 1-26. 
 Borovec, R.; Oberprieler, R.G. 2013: Afrophloeus, a new genus of African weevils of the tribe Embrithini (Coleoptera: Curculionidae: Entiminae), with description of a new species and notes on the composition of Embrithini. Zootaxa, 3693(3): 365–378.

External links 

Entiminae
Beetle tribes